American country music singer Toby Keith has released 21 studio albums and seven compilation albums. He has released 69 singles, with 65 of them charting on the Billboard country charts, of which all but ten reached top 40 or higher. 20 of his singles have reached number one in the United States, and 22 more have reached the Top 10.

As of December 2013, Toby Keith has sold over 30 million albums in the US, which made him the fifth best-selling country artist in the US since 1991 when Nielsen SoundScan started tracking music sales.

Studio albums

1990s

2000s

2010s and 2020s

Compilation albums

Singles

1990s

2000s

2010s and 2020s

Other singles

Guest singles

Other charted songs

Music videos

Guest appearances

Notes

References

Country music discographies
 
 
Discographies of American artists